The 2010 Volta a Catalunya was the 90th running of the race.
It was the second race of the UCI ProTour calendar of 2010, and took place from 22nd to 28th March 2010.

Participating teams
As the Volta a Catalunya was a UCI ProTour event, all 18 ProTour teams were automatically invited and obligated to send a squad. Four Professional Continental teams rounded out the event's peloton.

The 22 teams in the race were:

Route

Stages

Stage 1
22 March 2010, Lloret de Mar,  (individual time trial)

The course for the brief individual time trial, which opened the race was dead flat. This was the same course used in the two years previous in the time trial.

Stage 2
23 March 2010, Salt to Banyoles, 

This course included the race's first climb, the first-category Alt Els Àngels, which crested just before the  mark. The  after the descent to the finish line were mostly flat, leaving a sprint finish.

Peter Stetina and Jonathan Castroviejo formed a two-man escape after  of this stage. In their effort, they had gain the lead in the mountains and sprints competitions after this stage. The finish was contested in a bunched sprint, won by Mark Cavendish. It was Cavendish's first win of 2010 after a difficult early season.

Stage 2 Result

General Classification after Stage 2

Stage 3
24 March 2010, La Vall d'en Bas to La Seu d'Urgell, 

This was a difficult stage, with several categorized climbs. The outside categorization Alt del Pedraforça was the Cima Peris, the race's hardest climb, and crested just before the  mark, after two second-category climbs earlier on.

A 21-rider break began this stage, but it was pulled back after an hour. A group of 14 was next on the attack, after  had been covered. Xavier Tondó, Joaquim Rodríguez and Óscar Pereiro attacked out of the main field when the catch seemed imminent. Pereiro quickly dropped back, as they had at this point reached the hardest parts of the Alt de la Josa del Cadí climb, but Tondó and Rodríguez stayed away to the finish. Tondó won the sprint to the finish line, but Rodríguez became the new race leader, since he had had a better time in the stage 1 time trial. Tondó expressed after the stage that the win had great personal significance for him, since he is from Catalonia and grew up  from where the stage ended.

Stage 3 Result

General Classification after Stage 3

Stage 4
25 March 2010, Oliana to Ascó, 

This course started at an elevation, undulated gently for a while and then descended int preparation for two second-category climbs.

During that time, an eight-rider breakaway group formed. They were later reduced to four – Vladimir Efimkin, Thibaut Pinot, Francesco Bellotti, and Jurgen Van De Walle. During the Alt de Paumeres climb, Jens Voigt, who had earlier been dropped from the peloton, made a solo bridge to the four leaders. Once with the group, he set a pace that eventually cracked all of them, sending them back to the chase groups behind. Voigt was the first over the summit, alone. Rein Taaramäe and Roman Kreuziger caught up with Voigt on the descent. After dropping Kreuziger, Taaramäe and Voigt increased their lead over the -led main field, and finished 34 seconds better than them at the finish line. Taaramäe did most of the pace making in the final flat section, since he started on the seventh day in the overall standings and stood to gain more than Voigt, from having such a big time gap as possible on the peloton. Voigt was therefore able to win the sprint easily.

Stage 4 Result

General Classification after Stage 4

Stage 5
26 March 2010, Ascó to Cabacés, 

This was another hilly stage, marked by three categorized climbs, including one  from the finish line. The finish line came on a descent.

Four riders escaped just  into this stage. These were Davide Malacarne, Javier Ramirez, Sergio De Lis, and Gustavo César. Since Malacarne, 29 minutes behind race leader Joaquim Rodríguez, was the best-placed man in the group, the peloton was content to let them go. Their advantage quickly ballooned to ten minutes. Malacarne shod his breakaway companions  from the finish line and held on for the win. It was the first win of Malacarne's pro career, and it came on a stage that he and the team had specifically identified as one where a winning breakaway would likely happen.

Stage 5 Result

General Classification after Stage 5

Stage 6
27 March 2010, El Vendrell to Barcelona, 

The second half is mostly flat, concluding with a three-lap circuit in Barcelona that includes a visit to a small third-category climb on each lap. Forty-six riders finished the stage in the same group for a depleted bunched sprint. ' Samuel Dumoulin was easily the strongest sprinter in the group and won the stage, giving his team its 12th win of the season. His teammate Rein Taaramäe was second on the stage, the two of them securing their high places on a day when the financial services provider Cofidis decided to continue sponsoring the team for two more seasons. Each of the top ten riders in the overall standings finished with the leading group, so there was no significant change to those standings heading into the final day of racing.

Stage 6 Result

General Classification after Stage 6

Stage 7
28 March 2010, Sant Cugat del Vallès to Montmeló (Circuit de Catalunya), 

This stage was flat, concluding with eight laps on the Circuit de Catalunya in Montmeló.

The field stayed together through most of this stage. All but 20 riders were together for a bunched sprint, won by Juan José Haedo. His brother Sebastian Haedo was his final lead-out man, and took fifth place in the sprint. There was again no change to the overall standings after this stage; Joaquim Rodríguez, Xavier Tondó, and Rein Taaramäe finished on the event's final podium.

Stage 7 Result

Final General Classification

Classification leadership
In the 2010 Volta a Catalunya, three different jerseys were awarded. For the general classification, calculated by adding the finishing times of the stages per cyclist, the leader received a white jersey with green stripes on the sleeves. This classification is considered the most important of the Volta a Catalunya, and the winner of the general classification is considered the winner of the Volta a Catalunya.

Additionally, there was also a sprint classification, indicated with a blue jersey. In the sprint classification, cyclists got points for being one of the first three in intermediate sprints, with six points awarded for first place, four for second, and two for third.

There was also a mountains classification, indicated with a red jersey. In the mountains classifications, points were won by reaching the top of a mountain before other cyclists. All climbs were categorized, with most either first, second, or third-category, with more points available for the higher-categorized climbs.

References

External links
Homepage of Volta a Catalunya (spanish)

2010
Volta
2010 in Spanish road cycling
2010 UCI ProTour
2010 UCI World Ranking
March 2010 sports events in Europe